The 1959 Stanley Cup Finals  was the championship series of the National Hockey League's (NHL) 1958–59 season, and the culmination of the 1959 Stanley Cup playoffs. It was contested between the three-time defending champion Montreal Canadiens and the Toronto Maple Leafs. Montreal was making its ninth consecutive appearance in the Final series. It was Toronto's first appearance since their  win over Montreal. The Canadiens won the series, four games to one, for their fourth straight Cup victory.

Paths to the Finals
Montreal defeated the Chicago Black Hawks in six games to reach the finals. Toronto defeated the Boston Bruins in seven games to reach the finals.

Game summaries
Maurice Richard, hampered by injuries, had no points during the playoffs.

Stanley Cup engraving
The 1959 Stanley Cup was presented to Canadiens captain Maurice Richard by NHL President Clarence Campbell following the Canadiens 5–3 win over the Maple Leafs in game five.

The following Canadiens players and staff had their names engraved on the Stanley Cup

1958–59 Montreal Canadiens

Stanley Cup engravings 
 Ken Reardon name was spelt KEN READON VICE PRES missing an "R". Mistake was corrected on the replica cup created in 1992–93.

See also
 1958–59 NHL season

Notes

References

 Podnieks, Andrew; Hockey Hall of Fame (2004). Lord Stanley's Cup. Bolton, Ont.: Fenn Pub. pp 12, 50. 

Stanley Cup
Stanley Cup Finals
Montreal Canadiens games
Toronto Maple Leafs games
Stanley Cup Finals
1950s in Montreal
1959 in Quebec
Ice hockey competitions in Toronto
Stanley Cup Finals
1950s in Toronto
Ice hockey competitions in Montreal